Balrampur railway station is a railway station in Balrampur district, Uttar Pradesh. Its code is BLP. It serves Balrampur city. The station consists of two platforms. The platforms are not well sheltered. It lacks many facilities including water and sanitation.

Major trains 
Some of the important trains that runs from Balrampur are:

 Gorakhpur–Anand Vihar Terminal Humsafar Express (via Barhni)
 Lokmanya Express (11079/80)
 Sushasan Express (11111/11112)
 Lucknow Junction–Nakaha Jungle Passenger (55050/31)
 Gorakhpur–Gonda DEMU (75005/02)
 Gorakhpur–Gonda Junction DEMU (75007/08)
 Daliganj Junction–Nakaha Jungle Passenger (55032/49)
 Gorakhpur–Panvel Express (via Barhni)
 Bandra Terminus–Gorakhpur Antyodaya Express
 Gorakhpur–Bandra Terminus Express (via Barhni)
 Gorakhpur–Badshahnagar Intercity Express
 Gorakhpur–Sitapur Express (via Barhni)
 Champaran Humsafar Express (Katihar–Old Delhi railway station) (15705/15706)

References

Railway stations in Balrampur district
Lucknow NR railway division
Balrampur